Savabeel is a retired Australian Thoroughbred race horse and active sire. He is best known for his win in the 2004 Cox Plate. He was trained by Graeme Rogerson, and ridden by Chris Munce in his most important wins.

Breeding

Savabeel, foaled on 23 September 2001, is a brown horse sired by champion New Zealand sire Zabeel out of the multiple Group 1 winner Savannah Success.

Racing career

In Spring 2004 he won the race considered the Weight for Age Championship of Australasia, the Cox Plate, beating the previous year's winner Fields of Omagh. He was the first three-year-old to win the race since another son of Zabeel, Octagonal won the race nine years earlier in 1995. At the time of Savabeel's Cox Plate win, Rogerson described him as the best horse he had ever trained.

Savabeel also won the Group One 2004 Spring Champion Stakes over 2000m at Randwick.

After an excellent run for second behind Elvstroem in the C F Orr Stakes in February 2005, Savabeel had an unsuccessful autumn campaign which saw him only place once and was retired to stud in 2005.

All in all, he retired the winner of $2,760,460 in stakes.  Savabeel started on 14 occasions, winning 3 and placing on 4 occasions.

Stud career

Savabeel stands at Waikato Stud in the North Island of New Zealand, as one of the primary stallions.

Savabeel made a clean sweep of New Zealand's three stallion categories for the 2016–17 season. For the second straight year the stallion won the Grosvenor Award for New Zealand stakes earnings, the Dewar Stallion Trophy for Australasian earnings and the Centaine Award for global earnings.

Notable stock
Savabeel has sired 27 individual Group One winners:

'c = colt, f = filly, g = gelding

Pedigree

References

See also

 Thoroughbred racing in Australia
 Thoroughbred racing in New Zealand
 List of millionaire racehorses in Australia

2001 racehorse births
Champion Thoroughbred Sires of New Zealand
Racehorses bred in Australia
Racehorses trained in Australia
Cox Plate winners
Thoroughbred family 1-o
New Zealand Thoroughbred sires